Helen Camille Stanley Hartmeyer Gatlin (born April 6, 1930) is a composer, pianist, and violist who began working with electronic and microtonal music in the 1960s.

Stanley was born in Tampa, Florida, to Lucy Gage Crehore and Edward Stanley. She married John P. Hartmeyer in 1950. They had one daughter (Helen Marjorie), then divorced in early 1965. Later that year, Stanley married Richard Denby Gatlin. 

Stanley earned a B. Mus. from Cincinnati Conservatory in 1951; a graduate fellowship and M. Mus from Florida State University in 1954; and a B.S. from Muskingum College (Ohio) in 1961. Her teachers included Hans Barth and Ernst von Dohnányi.

Stanley has worked as a violist with the El Paso Symphony and as music director at the El Paso Ballet Center.  She has taught at Jones College and Jacksonville University. In 1986, she was the Florida Contemporary Ensemble’s composer-in-residence. Her awards include the C. Hugo Grimm Prize for Ensemble Composition; the Louis Pogner Chamber Music Award; the 1972 Florida State Music Teachers Association Award;  and the Jacksonville Community Foundation Award. She belongs to the American Society of Composers, Authors, and Publishers (ASCAP); the American Composers Forum; and the Southeastern Composers League. Her works were recorded commercially on MMC 2024 in 1997 and MMC 2149 in 2006.

Stanley composed electronic music and also experimented with microtonal music. She used environmental recordings, including live bird songs, in her Rhapsody for Electronic Tape and Orchestra. Her compositions include:

Ballet 

Birthday of the Infants

Chamber 

Brass Quartet

Fantasy and Fugue (brass)

Overture for Timpani and Brass

Piece (horn, percussion and piano)

Sonata (trombone and piano; commissioned by William Cramer) 

String Quartet No. 1 1951

String Quartet 1980

Suite for Tuba

Woodwind Quintet

Electronic Tape 

Electronic Prelude

Study

Orchestra 

Concerto Romatico (viola and orchestra)

Fanfare for Orchestra

Night Piece (women’s chorus and orchestra)

Passacaglia

Rhapsody for Electronic Tape and Orchestra

Symphony No. 1

Piano 

Duo Sonata (tape and piano)

Etudes

Meditation (tape and piano)

Modal Suite

Sonatina

Vocal 

“Tear Drops” (with Roy Calhoun, Edwin Charles, and Garry Goldner)

“The Isle”

References 

American women composers
String quartet composers
Electronic musicians
Microtonal composers
University of Cincinnati – College-Conservatory of Music alumni
Florida State University alumni
Jacksonville University faculty
ASCAP
Living people

1930 births

People from Tampa, Florida